Sir Charles William James Orr,  (20 September 1870 – 1945) was a British colonial administrator.

He was born the youngest son of Major Andrew Orr of Co. Londonderry and educated at Bath College and the Royal Military College, Woolwich. Charles’ elder sister was the astronomer Mary Acworth Orr.

He was commissioned into the Royal Garrison Artillery as a second lieutenant on 15 February 1889, and promoted to lieutenant on 15 February 1892. Serving in British India, he was promoted to captain on 7 September 1899. Following the outbreak of the Second Boer War later that year, in March 1900 he was seconded for service in South Africa. He was later promoted to the rank of major. In 1903 he became the British Resident in Northern Nigeria. From 1911 to 1917 he was Chief Secretary to the Government of Cyprus . and from 1919 to 1926 Colonial Secretary of Gibraltar. He was made CMG in 1921.

He served as Governor of the Bahamas from 1927 to 1932 and was knighted KCMG in 1928.

Orr wrote two well-received books during his career, The Making of Northern Nigeria in 1911 and Cyprus under British Rule in 1918.

His daughter Lettice married Sir Allen Lane, founder of Penguin books, becoming Lady Letitia Lucy Lane.

Publications 
Cyprus under British Rule (1918).

References

1870 births
1945 deaths
Graduates of the Royal Military Academy, Woolwich
Royal Garrison Artillery officers
Colonial Secretaries of Gibraltar
Governors of the Bahamas
British colonial governors and administrators in Africa
British colonial governors and administrators in Europe
British colonial governors and administrators in the Americas
British Army personnel of the Second Boer War